Fred Urmson (26 November 1907 – 11 September 1985) was an English footballer who played as an outside left for Atherton, Tranmere Rovers and Exeter City. He made 333 appearances for Tranmere, scoring 107 goals.

He also played for Stalybridge Celtic and South Liverpool and Mossley, where he scored eight goals in 28 appearances in the 1939–40 season.

References

1907 births
1985 deaths
People from Little Hulton
Association football wingers
English footballers
Atherton Collieries A.F.C. players
Tranmere Rovers F.C. players
Exeter City F.C. players
Mossley A.F.C. players
South Liverpool F.C. players
Stalybridge Celtic F.C. players